Vermilion is a town in central Alberta, Canada that is surrounded by the County of Vermilion River.

History 

It was not until 1902 that a significant number of settlers arrived in this area of Alberta, mostly of British ethnic background coming from the east. Just west of Vermilion is the line between British and those of Ukrainian ethnic background having travelled mostly from the west.

In 1905, the Canadian Northern Railway arrived and a station was built. The post office was relocated from Breage. Throughout the days of steam, the railway was important to Vermilion. Vermilion was used as a divisional point. It had a water tower to resupply engines, a large roundhouse, an extensive yard, a wye, a turntable, and a bunkhouse for engine crews. With the decline of steam power in the late 1950s and early 1960s, the railway became less important.

In early 1906, Vermilion was incorporated as a village and then as a town later in the same year. The name Vermilion comes from the red clay found in the river valley. In fact, one of the first businesses in Vermilion was the brick factory which operated from 1906 until 1914. Some Vermilion buildings built from brick from this factory are still standing.

The first newspaper to publish in the Vermilion area was the Vermilion Signal which was founded and edited by William Bleasdell Cameron. (a survivor of the Frog Lake Massacre). In 1909, S.R.P. Cooper established the Vermilion Standard, which continues to publish to this day.

In 1911, the provincial government established three demonstration farms near Olds, Fairview, and just west of the Vermilion townsite. The Vermilion Board of Trade had lobbied the government for a demonstration farm and or college. When the Vermilion School of Agriculture officially opened on November 17, 1913, it became the first of the provincial agricultural colleges to open its door. The Vermilion School of Agriculture has had several name changes in the intervening years including Vermilion Agricultural and Vocational College and Vermilion College before becoming Lakeland College in 1975.

Like other communities on the prairies in the early years of the 20th century, Vermilion experienced an extensive fire. Occurring on April 10, 1918, the fire destroyed 28 stores and business blocks.

Two Vermilion businesses have operated since before the town was incorporated. Craig's, a department store, and Long's, a drugstore, have been at the same downtown locations since 1905.

Demographics 

In the 2016 Census of Population conducted by Statistics Canada, the Town of Vermilion recorded a population of 4,084 living in 1,753 of its 1,988 total private dwellings, a  change from its 2011 population of 3,930.

Mayor and council
The Mayor of Vermilion is Gregory Throndson.

Economy 
The economy is largely service industry to agriculture.

Arts and culture 
The Vermilion Agricultural Society hosts an annual fair which started in 1906. The fair begins with a parade on Thursday morning.  The fair lasts a total of three days the last weekend in July.

Attractions 
The Vermilion Provincial Park is located on the northwest side of the town. It includes camping, fishing, canoeing and trails for hiking, cycling and cross-country skiing.

Education 
The town has two public schools: Vermilion Elementary (K-6) and J.R. Robson Secondary (7-12), and one Catholic school, St. Jerome's School (K-12). The School of Hope, a home school, has its central office in Vermilion.

The town also attracts students from throughout Canada to Lakeland College. Lakeland offers certificate, diploma, applied degree, university transfer, apprenticeship, and pre-employment programs. Programming at the Vermilion campus includes agricultural sciences, business, environmental sciences, fire and emergency response, human services, interior design technology, and trades and technology. Lakeland's residence village is home to more than 500 students.

Media 
Vermilion's local weekly newspapers are the Vermilion Standard and the Vermilion and Area Voice.

Notable people 
Brandon Baddock (born 1995), a professional ice hockey player.
Bill Flett (1943–1999), a former NHL player.
Ernie Isley (born 1937), a politician in the Legislative Assembly of Alberta. 
Alison Jackson (born 1988), an Olympic racing cyclist.
Ron Jones (born 1951), a former NHL player.
Ernie Kenny (1907–1970), a former NHL player.
Susan Massitti (born 1962 or 1963), a Winter Olympic speed skater.
Brent MacNab (1931–2020), a former professional ice hockey player.
Grant McNeill (born 1983), a former NHL player.
Charlie Mead (1921–2014), a former MLB player.
Beckie Scott (born 1974), a Winter Olympic cross-country skier and gold medalist.
Lloyd Snelgrove (born 1956), a politician in the Legislative Assembly of Alberta.
Jeff Woywitka (born 1983), a former NHL player

See also 
List of communities in Alberta
List of towns in Alberta

References

External links 

1906 establishments in Alberta
Towns in Alberta
Populated places established in 1906